The Department of Mathematics at Columbia University has presented a Professor Van Amringe Mathematical Prize each year (since 1910). The prize was established in 1910 by George G. Dewitt, Class of 1867. It was named after John Howard Van Amringe, who taught mathematics at Columbia (holding a professorship from 1865 to 1910), was the first Dean of Columbia College, and was the first president of the American Mathematical Society (between 1888 and 1890).

For many years, the prize was awarded to the freshman or sophomore mathematics student at Columbia College deemed most proficient in the mathematical subjects designated during the year of the award. More recently (since 2003), the prize has been awarded to three Columbia College students majoring in math (a freshman, a sophomore, and a junior) who are deemed proficient in their class in the mathematical subjects designated during the year of the award.

Recipients

External links
Columbia College Prizes
Columbia College Prizes and Fellowships
Past Prize Exams

Notes

Mathematics awards
Student awards
Awards established in 1910
Awards and prizes of Columbia University